Avtarjeet Singh Dhanjal (born 10 April 1940) is a British sculptor and a multi-media artist of Indian origin
whose work has been shown internationally for over four decades. He's an artist who is nourished by the tension between the cultures of East and West, and occupies a singular place in contemporary sculpture.

Avtarjeet Dhanjal’s international reputation as an artist derives primarily from his work over many years, especially in the 1970s, 1980s and 1990s, where as a sculptor, he works using various mediums like wood, aluminium, stone as he seeks out the relation to natural substances like weathered rocks and soil in his sculpture. His more recent works are focused on photography, installation and writing.

After leaving Art School in 1970, he travelled extensively around East Africa, gaining a teaching post at the Kenyatta University in Nairobi, before giving this up to attend St Martin’s School of Art, London in 1974. 
Dhanjal seeks to produce art that enhances the quality of human life - by inviting silence, stillness and contemplation. He argues that, to be truly creative, the artist needs to disengage himself from the races of contemporary society and the art world itself. That the artist’s quest should be to escape from the crowd and become attuned to the inner silence.

References

1940 births
Living people
Punjabi people
Indian Sikhs
Indian emigrants to the United Kingdom
Indian expatriates in Kenya
British people of Indian descent
British people of Punjabi descent
British Sikhs
English people of Indian descent
English people of Punjabi descent
English Sikhs
Indian male sculptors
20th-century Indian sculptors
Government College of Art, Chandigarh alumni
20th-century Indian male artists